The Ministry of War was a government ministry of the Kingdom of Brazil, and later of the Empire of Brazil and the Federative Republic of Brazil. It was created in 1815 to give the Kingdom of Brazil greater military autonomy from Portugal, and to unify the Armada (Navy) and Army under one power. It was renamed "Ministry of the Army" under the Costa e Silva administration and later incorporated into the Ministry of Defence in 1999.

References

See also
 Armed Forces of the Empire of Brazil
 Ministry of Defense of Brazil

Ministry of Defence (Brazil)
War